This is a list of Syrian artists, artists from Syria, or of Syrian descent.

A 

 Youssef Abdelke (born 1951), drawer, printmaker
 Aula Al Ayoubi (born 1973), painter, collagist
 Bengin Ahmad (born 1986), Syrian-Kurdish photographer
 Darin Ahmad (born 1979), artist, poet, and writer
 Khaled Akil (born 2000), Syrian-born Turkish multidisciplinary visual artist, photographer
 Krayem Awad (born 1948), Vienna-based painter, sculptor and poet, of Syrian origin

B 

 Riad Beyrouti (1944–2019), painter

F 
Ali Farzat (born 1951), political cartoonist

H 

 Omar Hamdi (1951–2015), Syrian Kurdish painter and designer, based in Vienna
 Mahmoud Hammad (1923–1988), painter, pioneer of modern Syrian art
 Wahbi al-Hariri (1914–1994), Syrian American sculptor, painter, architect

J 

 Nazem al-Jaafari (1918–2015), painter, pioneer of impressionism in Syria

K 

 Mamdouh Kashlan (born 1929), painter
 Marwan Kassab-Bachi (1934–2016), German-Syrian painter
 Louay Kayali (1934–1978), modern painter, drawer
 Khaled al-Khani (born 1975), painter
 Roland Khoury (1930–1988), painter

M 

 Fateh Moudarres (1922–1999), painter, leader of the modern art movement in Syria

N 

 Nazir Nabaa (1938–2016), painter

S 
Khairat Al-Saleh (born 1940), multidisciplinary artist, part of the Hurufiyya movement; born in Israel and lives in Britain
Kais Salman (born 1976), painter
Mamoun Sakkal (born 1950), calligrapher
Sara Shamma (born 1975), painter

Y 

 Hala Al-Abdallah Yacoub (born 1956), cinematographer, filmmaker

See also

 List of Syrians

 
Syria
Artists